Gatewood is both a surname and a given name. Notable people with the name include:

Surname:
 Aubrey Gatewood (born 1938), baseball player
 Bill Gatewood (born 1881), Negro leagues pitcher and manager
 Charles B. Gatewood, military officer who persuaded Geronimo to surrender to the US Army
 Curtis Gatewood (born 1985), American football linebacker
 Doug Gatewood, Democratic member of the Kansas House of Representatives
 George David Gatewood (born 1940), American astronomer
 Grandma Gatewood (1887–1973), extreme hiker and ultra-light hiking pioneer
 Kimmy Gatewood, American actress
 Otis Gatewood (1911–1999), preacher and missionary in Churches of Christ
 Randy Gatewood (born 1973), American football player
 Sean Gatewood, Democratic member of the Kansas House of Representatives
 Tom Gatewood (born 1950),  American football player
 Yusuf Gatewood(born 1982), Canadian-American film actor

Given name:
 Gatewood Galbraith (1947–2012), American lawyer and author
 Gatewood Lincoln (1875–1957), American Navy officer; 19th and 22nd Governor of American Samoa